Sybrin is a software company headquartered in Johannesburg, South Africa that sells enterprise software and services to the financial services, insurance, and telecommunications industries. Sybrin implemented the first cheque truncation system in Africa, the third in the world, in Malawi.

The company offers a low-code platform along with other prebuilt solutions in their digital banking and payments as well as their intelligent automation product range. These include Payments Hub, KYC and AML, Intelligent Document Processing, Liveness Detection, Digital Onboarding, and more.

Sybrin’s clients include corporates, insurance companies, telecommunication service providers, banking institutions, as well as central banks and national Automated Clearing Houses.

Sybrin has key support offices in Kenya, Mozambique, Tanzania, United Kingdom, Zambia, and Zimbabwe. Sybrin’s systems have been implemented in Botswana, Egypt, Eswatini, Ghana, Gibraltar, Isle of Man, Kenya, Kuwait, Lesotho, Malawi, Mauritius, Mozambique, Nigeria, Philippines, Rwanda, Seychelles, South Africa, Tanzania, Uganda, United Kingdom, Zambia, and Zimbabwe.

Sybrin has more than 600 software installations in 21 countries and a staff complement of 200. The company attained the Microsoft Line of Business Award and has been accredited as an Oracle Platinum Partner.

History
Founded in 1991, Sybrin shifted its operational headquarters to Johannesburg, South Africa in 2002.

In 2003, Sybrin obtained the contract for the implementation of the first cheque truncation system in Africa, the third in the world, which was implemented in Malawi.

In 2005, Sybrin opened a support office in Kenya.

In 2012, Sybrin opened support offices in Zambia and Tanzania.

On 13 October 2013, Sybrin was acquired by EOH, a multinational technology company listed on the Johannesburg Stock Exchange with over 11 000 employees.

In 2020, Sybrin partnered with the Mojaloop Foundation to advance financial inclusion in Africa and expanded their markets through strategic partnerships with various other organisations, including: Blisslead, Console, eBizolutions, Insight SCS, Legal Workflow, Nybble, OpenTech Kenya, Quetri, and Software People.

References

Business software companies
Financial software companies
Banking software companies
Software companies of South Africa
Companies based in Johannesburg
Software companies established in 1991
South African brands
South African companies established in 1991